Marcel Léger (June 8, 1930 – February 5, 1993) was a Canadian politician, and a supporter of Quebec sovereignty. He also founded the Canadian polling firm that became Léger Marketing.

Background
Léger was born in Montreal. He is the father of pollster Jean-Marc Léger and Parti Québécois MNA Nicole Léger.

Provincial Politics
Léger successfully ran as the Parti Québécois candidate in the provincial district of LaFontaine in 1970. He was re-elected in 1973, 1976 and 1981. He became Minister of the Environment in 1976, but was dropped from the Cabinet in 1982.

Federal Politics
Léger was leader of the Parti nationaliste du Québec from September 14, 1983 to May 17, 1984. In that capacity, he tried to establish a federal wing for the Parti Québécois and represent Quebec's interests in Ottawa. However PQ Leader René Lévesque conducted a beau risque policy and refused to endorse Léger's attempt.

Retirement from politics
Léger re-entered the Cabinet as Minister of Tourism in 1984. However he lost his seat in 1985. In 1986, he founded the polling firm "Léger et Léger" (today Léger Marketing).

Footnotes

1930 births
1993 deaths
French Quebecers
Parti nationaliste du Québec politicians
Parti Québécois MNAs
Politicians from Montreal